São Valentim ("Saint Valentine") is a district of the municipality of Santa Maria, in the Brazilian state of Rio Grande do Sul. It is situated in the west portion of Santa Maria. The district's seat is 12 km (7.46 miles) far from Downtown Santa Maria.

The district of São Valentim owns an area of 133.38 km2 that is equivalent to 7.44% of the municipality of Santa Maria that is 1791,65 km2.

History 
São Valentim was born in 1997 by the separation from district of Boca do Monte due to geographic factors and inhabitants' will.

Limits 

The district limits with the districts of Boca do Monte, Pains, Santa Flora and Sede, and with the municipality of Dilermando de Aguiar.

Neighbourhoods 
The district of São Valentim is divided in the following bairros, that in English is equivalent to neighbourhoods:
 São Valentim;

Roads and railway 
 In the district hasn't railway;
 The district has the following highways:
 BR-158: in the northwest portion of district, cutting the district in a stretch and in the boundary with the district of Boca do Monte.

References

External links 
Site oficial da Prefeitura de Santa Maria

Districts of Santa Maria, Rio Grande do Sul